Yancho Dimitrov (11 March 1943 – 4 December 1992) was a Bulgarian footballer who played as a forward. He competed in the men's tournament at the 1968 Summer Olympics.

References

External links
 

1943 births
1992 deaths
Bulgarian footballers
Bulgaria international footballers
First Professional Football League (Bulgaria) players
FC Dimitrovgrad players
PFC Beroe Stara Zagora players
PFC Slavia Sofia players
Olympic footballers of Bulgaria
Footballers at the 1968 Summer Olympics
Olympic silver medalists for Bulgaria
Olympic medalists in football
Medalists at the 1968 Summer Olympics
Association football forwards
People from Dimitrovgrad, Bulgaria
Sportspeople from Haskovo Province